Jean Passanante (born June 26, 1953) is an American television screenwriter, best known for her work in daytime soap operas. Passanante got her start as an actress doing bit parts in the 1980s, including John Sayles's Return of the Secaucus 7 and Lianna. She later became a soap opera writer.

Early life
Passanante was born on June 26, 1953 in St. Louis, Missouri, one of three daughters born to to Bart, a physician, and Alberta Passanante. Her sisters are Joy and Judy.

She graduated from Ladue Horton Watkins High School in 1971. She attended Dartmouth College.

Career

Acting
Passanante was in Return of the Secaucus 7 (1980) and Lianna (1983), both John Sayles films.

Writing
Passanante got her start on soaps working as a staff writer on the ABC Daytime drama One Life to Live from 1992 to 1996. In 1996 she was promoted to the top position of Head Writer, only to be replaced in 1997. She remained as a staff writer until 1998, at which time she was made Co-Head Writer of the ailing soap opera Another World. 

Passanante wrapped up the show's 35-year run in June 1999. The next month, she relieved All My Children creator Agnes Nixon of head writing duties after Nixon was called in to temporarily replace Megan McTavish.

Passanante's contract with  All My Children expired in 2001,  and she was replaced by Richard Culliton. She was then hired by CBS' As the World Turns in 2001, where she served as Co-Head Writer (second in command to Hogan Sheffer) until she was promoted to Head Writer in early 2005; she continued in that role through the show's 2010 cancellation.  

Following the cancellation of As the World Turns, Passanante returned to One Life to Live as Associate Head Writer, a role she held until 1998, until its television cancellation in January 2012. From January 25, 2008 through April 17, 2008, ATWT episodes were written by non-union writers due to Passanante and her team participating in the WGA strike. It is speculated that Christopher Goutman and Vivian Gundaker took over as Head Writers. Passanante's post-strike episodes hit the airwaves on April 18, 2008.

Passanante was one of the writers who followed Ron Carlivati to General Hospital as breakdown writer from May 3, 2012 until November 25, 2013 when Passanante was named head writer of The Young and the Restless, working alongside Shelly Altman. Passanante's tenure was from  December 23, 2013 to March 18, 2015, Passanante was also a breakdown writer for the show under Charles Pratt, Jr. from March 23, 2015 to June 18, 2015. 

In July 2015, Passanante and Altman returned to General Hospital as its co-head writers, replacing Carlivati. On June 6, 2017, Passanante announced her decision to retire from General Hospital, stating: "It gets to be a time when it’s just time. [...] And it seemed like the right time. I do have other things that I’m interested in pursuing and I have a daughter who lives in Europe, who I want to visit whenever I can. I have been pondering it for a long time. It’s a pretty consuming kind of job and you need to get your head clear of it every once in a while. It’s been a great 27 years, or something like that — it’s a long time!". Her retirement was reported in 2017, but in 2020 she was one of the recruits for a fiction app named "Radish" which had $63m of funding and it was opening an office in LA. The soap writers recruited included Passanante, Janet Iacobuzio, Addie Walsh, Lisa Connor and Leah Laiman.

Personal life
In 1985, Passanante married writer Jack Shannon. They have one daughter, Ruth Shannon.

Filmography

Acting

Film

Writing

Television

Awards and nominations
Daytime Emmy Awards: 
Win, 2014, Outstanding Drama Series Writing Team for The Young and the Restless
Wins, 2002, 2004 and 2005, Outstanding Drama Series Writing Team for As the World Turns
Nomination, 2003, Outstanding Drama Series Writing Team for As the World Turns
Nomination, 2001 and 2002, Outstanding Drama Series Writing Team for All My Children
Win, 1994, Outstanding Drama Series Writing Team for One Life to Live
Writers Guild of America Awards (WGA)
Win, 2015 and 2016, Best Daytime Serial for General Hospital
Win, 2007, Best Daytime Serial for As the World Turns
Nominations, 2005 and 2006, Daytime Serials for As the World Turns
Win, 2001 and 2002, Daytime Serials for All My Children
Win, 1992  for "One Life to Live"

References

External links
 
 

1953 births
Living people
American soap opera writers
Daytime Emmy Award winners
American women television writers
Writers Guild of America Award winners
Dartmouth College alumni
Place of birth missing (living people)
Women soap opera writers
Ladue Horton Watkins High School alumni
21st-century American women